Temne can refer to:
Temne people, an ethnic group of Sierra Leone
Kingdom of Koya or Temne Kingdom, 1505-1896 state in the north of present-day Sierra Leone
Temne language, spoken by the Temne people
 Temne War, an 1801–1805 conflict
 Temne-Susu War, an 1815 conflict